BPJ may refer to:

Bangladesh Pharmaceutical Journal, official journal of the Bangladesh Pharmaceutical Society
Beloit Poetry Journal, poetry magazine at Beloit College
 Binji language, ISO 639 code 'bpj'